Two ships in the United States Navy have been named USS Pillsbury for John E. Pillsbury.

United States Navy ship names